Harvey Nichols is a British luxury department store chain founded in 1831, at its flagship store in Knightsbridge, London. It sells designer fashion collections for men and women, fashion accessories, beauty products, fine wines and luxury foods. It is owned by Hong Kong luxury goods company Dickson Concepts. The chain has 14 locations worldwide, including a Beauty Bazaar in Liverpool and a brasserie in the OXO Tower, London.

History

In 1831 Benjamin Harvey opened a linen shop in a terraced house on the corner of Knightsbridge and Sloane Street in London.

In 1835 the shop expanded to number 8 next door, and would continue to expand into successive properties over the following years. In 1841 Benjamin employed James Nichols from Oxfordshire. In 1845 Nichols was promoted to management and in 1848 he married Harvey's niece, Anne Beale.

Benjamin Harvey died in 1850, leaving the business in the care of his wife Anne, who went into partnership with James Nichols to form Harvey Nichols & Co.

In 1889, the existing space was demolished to make way for a new department store. The building was designed by C. W. Stephens and built in stages between 1889 and 1894. In 1904 the location underwent a change of address to become 109-125 Knightsbridge. In 1920, Harvey Nichols was purchased by Debenhams.

In 1975 a restaurant called Harvey's opened on the fifth floor.

In 1985 Debenhams including Harvey Nichols was acquired by the Burton Group.  In 1991, Dickson Poon of Dickson Concepts acquired Harvey Nichols from the Burton Group.  Harvey Nichols was refurbished. A new restaurant, café, bar and food market, designed by architects Wickham & Associates, opened on the fifth floor in 1992, with a direct access lift which allowed for later opening hours after the main store closed. Ten years later in 2002, the restaurant interior was replaced by a new design by Lipschutz Davison.

Throughout its run in the 1990s and 2000s, Harvey Nichols was heavily mentioned in BBC comedy series Absolutely Fabulous, starring Jennifer Saunders and Joanna Lumley.

On 17 February 2014 Stacey Cartwright joined Harvey Nichols as chief executive officer of the Harvey Nichols Group of Companies. She replaced Joseph Wan, who held the position of CEO for 21 years and who retired at the end of March 2014.

On 1 January 2018, Daniela Rinaldi, formerly Group Commercial Director and Manju Malhotra, formerly Group Finance Director, were appointed as Co-Chief Operating Officers.

Former CEO Stacey Cartwright left the company on 30 April 2018, handing over control of the company to Daniela Rinaldi and Manju Malhotra. Under their management, Harvey Nichols generated 229 million pounds for the year to 30 March 2019, which marked a nine percent increased from the year before.

In November 2019, co-chief operating officer Daniela Rinaldi resigned from the company, after working for the department store for nearly 35 years. The other co-operating chief, Manju Malhotra, will continue the role in a solo capacity, working closely with executive director Pearson Poon.

Locations

UK and Ireland 
In the United Kingdom, Harvey Nichols has stores in London, Leeds, Edinburgh, Birmingham, Manchester, Bristol and a Beauty Bazaar at Harvey Nichols' store in Liverpool. It also has a store at Dundrum Town Centre, Dublin in Ireland.

The London flagship store is in Knightsbridge, a few streets from rival Harrods.  In addition to its fashion retailing business, Harvey Nichols redeveloped the top floor of its London store to create a restaurant, bar, café, wine shop, and foodmarket. A similar concept operates from the top floors of all Harvey Nichols full-size stores.

In 1996 Harvey Nichols launched its first stand-alone restaurant in London, the OXO Tower Restaurant, Bar, and Brasserie, viewing the River Thames. OXO and three of the in-store restaurants were designed by London-based architects Lifschutz Davidson Sandilands.

Harvey Nichols opened a 22,000 square foot "Beauty Bazaar" store in Manesty's Lane in the Liverpool One shopping area in 2012.

In May 2013, Harvey Nichols announced they were to double the size of the Birmingham store located in The Mailbox complex. The store will cover 45,000 square feet, double the size of the existing store.

International 
Hong Kong SAR: Its flagship is located at The Landmark in Central. Harvey Nichols also has a one-level store in Pacific Place and a Beauty Bazaar (The One) in Hong Kong.

Riyadh, Saudi Arabia: It has a store in Al-Faysaliyah Tower in Riyadh, Saudi Arabia

Dubai, UAE: In February 2006, it opened a store in Dubai, designed by architecture firm Callison in the Mall of the Emirates. The Dubai store is operated by Al Tayer Insignia, the luxury retail arm of Al Tayer Group.

Kuwait City, Kuwait: On 25 January 2009, a new store opening was announced for Kuwait which opened in 2012. The store is located at The Avenues Mall.

Doha, Qatar: In 2018, Harvey Nichols opened a store at Doha Festival City in Doha, Qatar. The Doha store is operated by Al Mana Group of Companies.

Former locations 
Jakarta, Indonesia: A store in the Grand Indonesia mall also designed by Callison in Jakarta, Indonesia was operated by the Indonesian retail conglomerate Mitra Adiperkasa (MAP) from October 2008, but closed due to poor performance in November 2010.

Baku, Azerbaijan: In 2015, Harvey Nichols opened a store in Baku, Azerbaijan. After four months, Harvey Nichols terminated its licence agreement with the Baku store, which now trades under BARKERS.

Istanbul, Turkey: In Turkey, Harvey Nichols opened a store in Istanbul's Kanyon Shopping Mall on 13 October 2006 and Ankara's Next Level in 2017 (now closed as of 2020). As of 2020, the Kanyon store is operated by DEMSA Group despite not featured on Harvey Nichols' website. On 19 April 2021 it was reported that the company was leaving Istanbul.

Controversies
Soon after opening a new store in Edinburgh in 2002, the managers faced an official complaint after staff tried to stop a homeless man selling the Big Issue magazine outside.

In mid-2003 objections were made to a Harvey Nichols magazine advertisement that appeared in Vogue, ELLE and Harpers & Queen and on a poster. The complainants objected that the advertisement was irresponsible, because it showed unsafe driving and was offensive to people who had been, or who knew people who had been involved in road accidents.

In September 2013, Harvey Nichols resumed the sale of fur in its United Kingdom stores following a decade-long embargo. The decision attracted much criticism, focusing on the way animals were treated. The company denied allegations of cruelty and insisted its furs are ethically sourced from reputable suppliers.

References

External links

Harvey Nichols Knightsbridge project – Lifschutz Davidson Sandilands

British Royal Warrant holders
Buildings and structures in the Royal Borough of Kensington and Chelsea
Companies formerly listed on the London Stock Exchange
Debenhams
Department stores of the United Kingdom
Food halls
Knightsbridge
Shops in London
Tourist attractions in the Royal Borough of Kensington and Chelsea
Retail companies established in 1831
British companies established in 1831
Buildings by C. W. Stephens